Rashtriya Lok Janshakti Party ( RLJP; translation: National People's Manpower Party) is an Indian political party formed in October 2021 under the leadership of MP Pashupati Kumar Paras. It was previously part of the unified Lok Janshakti Party but it has now factioned into two parties, with the other faction forming the Lok Janshakti Party (Ram Vilas). After faction Rashtriy Lok Janshakti Party led by Pashupati Paras become part of NDA.

The party contested 2022 Manipur Legislative Assembly election but failed to win any seat.

Bhushan Rai, candidate of Rashtriy Lok Janshakti Party won the MLC seat from Vaishali in 2022.

References 

State political parties in Bihar
Political parties in India
2021 establishments in Bihar
Lok Janshakti Party
Political parties established in 2021